Sigurd Mathisen (26 April 1883 – 4 March 1919) was a Norwegian speed skater, world champion and world record holder over 500 m. He was an older brother of Oscar Mathisen.

International championships
Mathisen won a gold medal at the 1904 World Allround Championships, where he won the 1500 m (shared), 5000 m and 10,000 m races. All distances were originally won by Peter Sinnerud, but he was later disqualified for professionalism, and Mathisen was declared world champion.

He died of the Spanish flu.

Records

World record
In 1908 Sigurd Mathisen improved the world record on 500 m to 44.4 seconds (sharing the record with Johan Vikander). The record was beaten in 1912 by Oscar Mathisen.

Source: SpeedSkatingStats.com

Personal records

References

1883 births
1919 deaths
Norwegian male speed skaters
World record setters in speed skating
Sportspeople from Oslo
World Allround Speed Skating Championships medalists
Deaths from the Spanish flu pandemic in Norway